Holy Trinity Church (Dreifaltigkeitskirche) is a Lutheran church in Bad Berneck im Fichtelgebirge. It is part of the Evangelical Lutheran Church in Bavaria, a member church of the Evangelical Church in Germany.

History 
Holy Trinity Church was inaugurated in 1800. It was built in the classical style and stands on the site of an ancient Catholic church. The interior of the church was completed in 1837. The altar sandstone statues, sculpted by Elias Räntz, depict Moses and Luke the Evangelist. The altar and baptismal font were designed by Johann Nestler.

References 

Lutheran churches in Bavaria
Buildings and structures in Bayreuth (district)
Churches completed in 1837